Laura Orgué Vila (born 11 September 1986, in Barcelona) is a Spanish cross country skier and sky runner who has competed since 2004. Competing in three Winter Olympics, she earned her best finish of 10th in the 30 km skating at Sochi in 2014. In 2014, she switched her focus from skiing to trail running.

Biography
At the FIS Nordic World Ski Championships 2009 in Liberec, Orgue finished 29th in the 30 km, 35th in the 10 km, and did not start the individual sprint event.
Same year, in 2009, she reached the bronze medal on 10 km F at the U23 World Championships in Praz de Lys-Sommand. Furthermore, she finished second in the OPA Cup (European league).

Her best World Cup finish was 17th in a 10 km event at Poland in 2014.

Olympic results

See also
 List of multi-sport athletes - Skyrunning

References

External links
 
 
 

1986 births
Cross-country skiers at the 2006 Winter Olympics
Cross-country skiers at the 2010 Winter Olympics
Cross-country skiers at the 2014 Winter Olympics
Living people
Olympic cross-country skiers of Spain
Spanish female cross-country skiers
Tour de Ski skiers
Skiers from Catalonia
Spanish sky runners
Skyrunning World Championships winners